Coeur d'Alene Mission of the Sacred Heart is a historic church mission school off U.S. 95 in Desmet, Idaho.

The mission was added to the National Register of Historic Places in 1975.

The mission was destroyed by fire in 2011.

The NRHP-listed building was a major schoolhouse which had been built in two phases.  Its three-story front section was built after 1900.  A smaller hip-roofed two-story brick structure, connected at the rear, was built after 1877.

At the time of NRHP listing, the first floor of another early structure survived in a two-story building, but was not deemed eligible for NRHP listing.

The original chapel of the mission was destroyed in a 1939 fire.

References

Former Roman Catholic church buildings in Idaho
Churches on the National Register of Historic Places in Idaho
Buildings and structures in Benewah County, Idaho
National Register of Historic Places in Benewah County, Idaho